The following is a list of notable events and releases of the year 1892 in Norwegian music.

Events

Deaths

Births

 June
 5 – Carsten Carlsen, pianist and composer (died 1961).

See also
 1892 in Norway
 Music of Norway

References

 
Norwegian music
Norwegian
Music
1890s in Norwegian music